Rawmarsh is a civil parish in the Metropolitan Borough of Rotherham, South Yorkshire, England.  The parish contains five listed buildings that are recorded in the National Heritage List for England.  Of these, one is listed at Grade II*, the middle of the three grades, and the others are at Grade II, the lowest grade.  The parish contains the village of Rawmarsh, and the listed buildings consist of a farmhouse, a rectory, a pumping house, and a church and associated structures.


Key

Buildings

References

Citations

Sources

 

Lists of listed buildings in South Yorkshire
Buildings and structures in the Metropolitan Borough of Rotherham